The Australian Dictionary of Biography (ADB or AuDB) is a national co-operative enterprise founded and maintained by the Australian National University (ANU) to produce authoritative biographical articles on eminent people in Australia's history. Initially published in a series of twelve hard-copy volumes between 1966 and 2005, the dictionary has been published online since 2006 by the National Centre of Biography at ANU, which has also published Obituaries Australia (OA) since 2010.

History
The ADB project has been operating since 1957. Staff are located at the National Centre of Biography in the History Department of the Research School of Social Sciences at the Australian National University. Since its inception, 4,000 authors have contributed to the ADB and its published volumes contain 9,800 scholarly articles on 12,000 individuals.  210 of these are of Indigenous Australians, which has been explained by Bill Stanner's "cult of forgetfulness" theory around the contributions of Indigenous Australians to Australian society.

Similar titles
The ADB project should not be confused with the much smaller and older Dictionary of Australian Biography by Percival Serle, first published in 1949, nor with the German Allgemeine Deutsche Biographie (published 1875–1912) which may also be referred to as ADB in English sources. Another similar Australian title from an earlier era was Philip Mennell's Dictionary of Australasian Biography (1892).

General editors 
Since the project began there have been six general editors , namely:

 Douglas Pike (1962–1974)
 Bede Nairn (1974–1984)
 Geoff Serle (1975–1987)
 John Ritchie (1988–2002)
 Diane Langmore (2001–2008)
 Melanie Nolan (2008– )

Publications

Hardcopy volumes
To date, the ADB has produced eighteen hardcopy volumes of biographical articles on important and representative figures in Australian history, published by Melbourne University Press. In addition to publishing these works, the ADB makes its primary research material available to the academic community and the public.

Online publication
On 6 July 2006, the Australian Dictionary of Biography Online was launched by Michael Jeffery, Governor-General of Australia, and received a Manning Clark National Cultural Award in December 2006. The website is a joint production of the ADB and the Australian Science and Technology Heritage Centre, University of Melbourne (Austehc).

Obituaries Australia

Obituaries Australia (OA), a digital repository of digital obituaries about significant Australians, went live in August 2010, after operating as an in-house database for some time, using Canberra Times journalist and deputy editor John Farquharson's obituaries for its pilot. The National Centre of Biography encouraged the public to send in scanned copies of obituaries and other biographical material

The fully searchable database also links the obituaries to important digitised records such as war service records, ASIO files and oral history interviews, in libraries, archives and museums. and will link to a search on the name in Trove, the National Library of Australia's database of newspapers, library catalogue holdings, government gazettes and other material.

The database comprises obituaries about "anyone who has made a contribution to Australian life"; some have not even visited Australia but had political or business connections and interests. There are links between ADB and AO on each entry where articles exist on both databases.

Criticism

In 2018, Clinton Fernandes wrote that ADB is conspicuously silent on the slaveholder or slave profiting pasts of a number of influential figures in the development of Australia, including George Fife Angas, Isaac Currie, Archibald Paull Burt, Charles Edward Bright, Alexander Kenneth Mackenzie, Robert Allwood, Lachlan Macquarie, Donald Charles Cameron, John Buhot, John Belisario, Alfred Langhorne, John Samuel August, and Godfrey Downes Carter. However, the Legacies database from which Fernandes obtains this information is ambiguous as to Angas's connection with slavery. It states that he did not lodge the claims himself but collected the compensatory amount for unknown reasons.

The original entries were written in the 1960s, and some are awaiting updating.

References

External links
 
 

Australian biographical dictionaries
Melbourne University Publishing books
Publications established in 1966